Borboniella is a genus of moths belonging to the subfamily Tortricinae of the family Tortricidae. The genus was erected by Alexey Diakonoff in 1957.

Species

Borboniella allomorpha (Meyrick, 1922)
Borboniella bifracta Diakonoff, 1957
Borboniella chrysorrhoea Diakonoff, 1957
Borboniella conflatilis Diakonoff, 1977
Borboniella cubophora Diakonoff, 1957
Borboniella discruciata (Meyrick, 1930)
Borboniella gigantella Guillermet, 2004
Borboniella leucaspis Diakonoff, 1957
Borboniella marmaromorpha Diakonoff, 1957
Borboniella montana Diakonoff, 1957
Borboniella octops Diakonoff, 1957
Borboniella pelecys Diakonoff, 1957
Borboniella peruella Guillermet, 2012
Borboniella rosacea Diakonoff, 1960
Borboniella rougonella Guillermet, 2012
Borboniella spudaea Diakonoff, 1957
Borboniella striatella Guillermet, 2012
Borboniella tekayaella Guillermet, 2013
Borboniella viettei Diakonoff, 1957
Borboniella vulpicolor Diakonoff, 1957

See also
 List of Tortricidae genera

References

 , 1957, Mm. Inst. scient. Madagascar (E) 8: 242.
 , 2005, World Catalogue of Insects 5.

External links
 tortricidae.com

Borboniella
Tortricidae genera
Taxa named by Alexey Diakonoff